Parliamentary elections were held in Vietnam on 19 May 2002. A total of 759 candidates, including 125 independents, contested the election. The Vietnamese Fatherland Front was the only organisation to nominate candidates, with 634 coming from the Communist Party of Vietnam and 125 being non-party members. The Communist Party won 447 of the 498 seats. Voter turnout was reported to be 99%.

Results

References

Vietnam
Elections in Vietnam
2002 in Vietnam
One-party elections
Election and referendum articles with incomplete results